This is a list of notable delicatessens. A delicatessen is a retail establishment that sells a selection of unusual or foreign prepared foods. Delicatessens originated in Germany during the 1700s. They later spread to the United States in the mid-1800s during the diaspora of European immigrants. Because of their cultural ties to Central and Eastern European culture, the Ashkenazi Jews popularized the delicatessen within American culture beginning in 1888.

Delicatessens

Europe
 Dallmayr – Munich, Germany
 Deli de Luca – Norwegian convenience store and delicatessen chain
 Delicatessen stores in Poland

England

 The Cheese Shop, Louth –  Louth, Lincolnshire, England
 Fortnum & Mason – Piccadilly, London
 Gaby's Deli –  Charing Cross Road (closed)
 Scandinavian Kitchen – London

United States
 Bavarian Meats, Seattle
 Brent's Deli, Northridge, California
 Chick's Deli, New Jersey
 Canter's, Los Angeles, California
 DeLaurenti Food & Wine, Seattle
 Dixie Chili and Deli, Kentucky
 Edelweiss Sausage & Delicatessen, Portland, Oregon
 Fossati's Delicatessen, Texas
 Jason's Deli – has locations in 29 U.S. states
 McAlister's Deli – has locations in 24 U.S. states
 Michou Deli – Pike Place Market, Seattle
 Molinari's – San Francisco
 Nate 'n Al – Beverly Hills, California
 Sebastiano's, Portland, Oregon
 Zingerman's – Ann Arbor MI

Jewish delicatessens

A Jewish deli, also known as a Jewish delicatessen, is a delicatessen establishment that serves various traditional dishes in Ashkenazi Jewish cuisine, and are typically known for their sandwiches such as pastrami on rye, as well as their soups such as matzo ball soup, among other dishes.

By type
 Expatriate delicatessen

See also

 List of submarine sandwich restaurants
 Lists of restaurants
 Specialty foods

References

Lists of restaurants
Retailing-related lists